Mitch Unrein (born March 25, 1987) is a former American football defensive tackle. He was signed by the Houston Texans as an undrafted free agent in 2010. He played college football at Wyoming.

Professional career

Denver Broncos
In a game against the Tampa Bay Buccaneers on December 2, 2012, Unrein lined up for the first time as at the fullback position. He then proceeded to catch his first career touchdown pass from quarterback Peyton Manning.

On April 11, 2013, Unrein signed a one-year, $630,000 tender.

The Broncos placed a one-year $1.431 million tender on Unrein on March 7, 2014.

San Diego Chargers
Unrein signed with the San Diego Chargers on March 19, 2015.

On September 24, 2015, the San Diego Chargers reinforced the tight end position, bringing back Kyle Miller nine days after he was waived on September 15.  To make room, the team released Unrein.

Chicago Bears 

Unrein was signed by the Chicago Bears on September 25, 2015. On November 9, 2015, he lined up at fullback against the San Diego Chargers. This was the first of many times he was used like this by the Bears. He ended the 2015 season with 32 tackles, two tackles-for-loss, and a sack.

On March 12, 2016, Unrein was re-signed by the Bears to a two-year contract.

In 2017, Unrein started eight out of 12 games played, recording a career-high 32 tackles and 2.5 sacks. He was placed on injured reserve on December 5, 2017.

Tampa Bay Buccaneers 
On March 16, 2018, Unrein signed a three-year, $10.5 million contract with the Tampa Bay Buccaneers. He was placed on injured reserve on September 3, 2018 with a concussion.

On March 13, 2019, Unrein was released by the Buccaneers.

Personal life
Unrein is married to Olympic bronze-medalist trapshooter Corey Cogdell.

He has five siblings. His older brothers Mark and Mike, both played college football for the University of Northern Colorado Bears. His older sister Natalie, who also went to UNC, is a three-time All-American swimmer and still holds one of the top-10 records for the 100 meter backstroke in UNC history. He is also distant cousins with former NFL defensive end Terry Unrein, who was selected in the third round of the 1986 NFL Draft by the San Diego Chargers.

References

External links
Official website
Chicago Bears bio
Wyoming Cowboys bio

1987 births
Living people
People from Weld County, Colorado
Players of American football from Colorado
American football defensive tackles
American football defensive ends
Wyoming Cowboys football players
Houston Texans players
Denver Broncos players
San Diego Chargers players
Chicago Bears players
Tampa Bay Buccaneers players